BattleTech Record Sheets are a series of game supplements published by FASA in 1996 for the wargame BattleTech.

Contents
BattleTech Record Sheets are a series of record sheets for mecha and military vehicles. BattleTech Record Sheets 3025 & 3026 has 224 pages of over 200 records compiled from BattleTech Technical Readout: 3025 and BattleTech Technical Readout: 3026, while BattleTech Record Sheets 3055 & 3058 has 256 pages and 250 sheets compiled from BattleTech Technical Readout: 3055 and BattleTech Technical Readout: 3058. All sheets are hole-punched for five-ring binders, and the pages are perforated along the spine.

Reception
In the May 1996 edition of Arcane (Issue 6), Jim Swallow was ambivalent about the record sheets, pointing out that "The cover art is nice, but these are nothing to get excited about - they're books of record sheets. You can get exactly the same thing in a few minutes with the basic rules, a pencil and a copy of the relevant BattleTech Technical Readout." Swallow gave the sheets a below average rating of 4 out of 10.

In the June 1996 edition of Dragon (Issue 230), Rick Swan thought that because the sheets covered so many different vehicles, "this may be the bext value in the history of the hobby!"

References

BattleTech supplements
Character sheets